Ritscher Peak is a  peak located  west-southwest of Mount Mentzel in the Gruber Mountains of Queen Maud Land, Antarctica. This peak was discovered and mapped by the Third German Antarctic Expedition of 1938–39 and was named for Capt. Alfred Ritscher, leader of the expedition.

References

External links
 United States Geological Survey, Geographic Names Information System (GNIS)
 Scientific Committee on Antarctic Research (SCAR)

Mountains of Queen Maud Land
Princess Astrid Coast